A deluge gun, fire monitor, master stream or deck gun is an aimable controllable high-capacity water jet used for manual firefighting or automatic fire protection systems. Deluge guns are often designed to accommodate foam which has been injected in the upstream piping.

Installation
Deluge guns are often fitted to fire boats, tug boats, and atop large fire trucks for use in manual firefighting, where they can be aimed and operated by one firefighter and are used to deliver water or foam from outside the immediate area of the fire. Deluge guns are sometimes installed in fixed fire protection systems to protect high hazards, such as aviation hangars and helicopter landing pads. Similarly, facilities with highly flammable material such as oil refineries may have permanently-installed deluge guns. Most apparatus-mounted deluge guns can be directed by a single firefighter, compared to a standard fire hose which normally requires several. Deluge guns can be automatically positioned for fixed systems, or may have portable designs. The latter option enables a firefighter to set up the gun to apply water to a blaze, before leaving it in place to attend to other tasks.

Capacity 
It is delivered by a master stream device, such as a deck gun, deluge gun, or fire monitor. Master streams are often found at the end of aerial ladders, tele-squirt nozzles, or monitor nozzles. The high pressure that they require renders them unsuitable for handline use.

Risks
A master stream brings with it many risks when used in an urban setting. A master stream should never be fired into an occupied building, as the force could knock down a supporting wall and crush victims. Also, the steam from the high volume of water delivered could cause a blowout or displace oxygen from an enclosed area, creating a risk of asphyxiation.

See also
Standpipe (firefighting)
Water cannon
Water gun
Water salutes, often carried out with deluge guns

References

US Patent for improved mobile fire apparatus
ABS Rules for Steel Vessels 2007 5C.9.11/3 Specific Vessel Types- Chemical Carriers, Fire Protection and Fire Extinction

Fire protection
Firefighting equipment